The Franklin Avenue station was a station on the demolished BMT Lexington Avenue Line in Brooklyn, New York City. It had 2 tracks and 2 side platforms. The station was originally built on May 13, 1885. It was located at the intersection of Lexington Avenue and Franklin Avenue in Brooklyn. The station had connections to two trolley lines; One was the Franklin Avenue Line and other was the Greene and Gates Avenues Line. It closed on October 13, 1950. The next southbound stop was Greene Avenue. The next northbound stop was Nostrand Avenue.

References

External links

BMT Lexington Avenue Line stations
Railway stations in the United States opened in 1885
Railway stations closed in 1950
Former elevated and subway stations in Brooklyn